The 1932 Ole Miss Rebels football team represented the University of Mississippi during the 1932 Southern Conference football season. Zollie Swor starred for Ole Miss.

Schedule

References

Ole Miss
Ole Miss Rebels football seasons
Ole Miss Rebels football